Where Did Everyone Go? is a 1963 studio album by Nat King Cole, arranged by Gordon Jenkins. This was the fourth and final album that Cole and Jenkins recorded together, following Love Is the Thing (1957), The Very Thought of You (1958) and Every Time I Feel the Spirit (1959).

Reception
The initial Billboard review from April 13, 1963 commented that "Here he is in a superb collection of ballad tunes, many of them in a lonesome, blue mood, with standout backing provided by Gordon Jenkins...Great mood wax for buyers and spinners".

The Allmusic review of Where Did Everyone Go? by Lindsay Planer said "there is a perceptible poignancy and longing weaved throughout Jenkins' arrangements. The opener "Where Did Everyone Go?" possesses a solitude accentuated by responsive instrumentation that supports, yet never intrudes. Cole's practically conversational delivery of pop standards...become musical soliloquies with the score as a sonic subtext."

Track listing
 "Where Did Everyone Go?" (Mack David, Jimmy Van Heusen) – 4:35
 "Say It Isn't So" (Irving Berlin) – 3:06
 "If Love Ain't There" (Johnny Burke) – 3:10
 "(Ah, the Apple Trees) When the World Was Young" (M. Philippe Gerard, Angela Vannier, Johnny Mercer) – 4:01
 "Am I Blue" (Harry Akst, Grant Clarke) – 3:01
 "Someone to Tell It To" (Sammy Cahn, Dolores Fuller, Van Heusen) – 3:16
 "The End of a Love Affair" (Edward Redding) – 3:10
 "I Keep Going Back to Joe's" (Marvin Fisher, Jack Segal) – 2:38
 "Laughing on the Outside (Crying on the Inside)" (Ben Raleigh, Bernie Wayne) – 2:47
 "No, I Don't Want Her" (Joe Bailey) – 3:03
 "Spring Is Here" (Lorenz Hart, Richard Rodgers) – 2:34
 "That's All There Is (There Isn't Anymore)" (Gordon Jenkins) – 2:42

Personnel

Performance
 Nat King Cole – vocal
 Gordon Jenkins – arranger, conductor

References

1963 albums
Nat King Cole albums
Albums arranged by Gordon Jenkins
Capitol Records albums
Albums conducted by Gordon Jenkins

Albums recorded at Capitol Studios